Souradyuti Paul (born 1976) is an Indian cryptologist. Formerly a member of COSIC, he is currently working as an associate professor at Indian Institute of Technology Bhilai and a Guest Researcher for the National Institute of Standards and Technology in the United States. He participated in cryptanalysis of RC4, Helix and Py family of ciphers among others. He has co-designed the following ciphers

 RC4A
 RCR-32, RCR-64.

He also contributed to the design of a hash function iteration mode of operation Fast-widepipe. While working at NIST Dr. Paul has worked towards the development of US government secure hash standard SHA-3 being selected through a public competition.

References

External links 
 Souradyuti Paul's homepage at the Catholic University of Leuven
 Souradyuti Paul's weblog addressing computer security related issues
 Souradyuti Paul's Crypto Lounge Entry

Living people
Modern cryptographers
Indian computer scientists
Indian cryptographers
1976 births